Grass is a 2018 South Korean drama film written, produced, and directed by Hong Sang-soo. It was released theatrically on October 25, 2018.

Premise
The story about a patron of a Seoul café who observes her fellow customers as they while away their days, drawing inspiration from their conversations for her writing.

Cast
Kim Min-hee as A-reum 
Jung Jin-young as Kyung-soo 
Gi Ju-bong as Chang-soo
Seo Young-hwa as Sung-hwa 
Kim Sae-byuk as Ji-young
Ahn Jae-hong as Hong-soo
Gong Min-jeung as Mi-na
Ahn Sun-young
Shin Seok-ho
Kim Myung-soo
Lee Yoo-young

Awards and nominations

Production
Principal photography began on September 7, 2017, and wrapped on September 21, 2017.

The film marks the sixth collaboration between actress Kim Min-hee and director Hong Sang-soo.

Release
The film premiered at the 68th Berlin International Film Festival on February 16, 2018. In early October 2018, the film was screened in the "Korean Cinema Today – Panorama" program of the 23rd Busan International Film Festival.

References

External links

Grass at Naver Movies 

2018 films
2018 drama films
Films directed by Hong Sang-soo
South Korean black-and-white films
South Korean drama films
2010s South Korean films